Dorjulopirata is a genus of spiders in the family Lycosidae. It was first described in 1997 by Buchar. , it contains only one species, Dorjulopirata dorjulanus, found in Bhutan.

References

Lycosidae
Monotypic Araneomorphae genera
Spiders of Asia